Sir Henry Bedingfeld (1505–1583), also spelled Bedingfield, of Oxburgh Hall, King's Lynn, Norfolk, was a Privy Councillor to King Edward VI and Queen Mary I, Lieutenant of the Tower of London, and (in 1557) Vice-Chamberlain of the Household and Captain of the guards. With Sir Henry Jerningham he was among the principals who rallied to Mary's cause following the death of Edward VI in 1553 and helped to set her upon the throne. He was a senior figure in the kinship group of Catholic recusant landowning knights of Suffolk. Given responsibility for the custody of Mary I's half-sister Elizabeth when in the Tower of London and at Woodstock, his reputation has suffered from the repetition of claims of his severity towards her: however Queen Elizabeth was respectful towards him and continued to find service for him. Among the foremost Englishmen of his time, he occupied prominent and honourable positions and was of unquestioned loyalty.

Family and education

Sir Henry was the eldest of five sons of Sir Edmund Bedingfield (1479/80–1553) and his wife, Grace (died in or after 1553), the daughter of Henry Marney, 1st Baron Marney. His brothers were Francis, Anthony, Humphrey and Edmond, and his sisters were Elizabeth and Margaret. In February 1527/28, he was admitted to Lincoln's Inn. The Bedingfelds were closely connected to the ancient family of Beaupré, of Beaupré Hall, Outwell/Upwell, Norfolk.

During the 1530s he married Katherine (died 1581), the daughter of Sir Roger Townshend of Raynham, Norfolk and his wife Amy Brewes, daughter and co-heiress of William de Brewse of Wenham Hall, Suffolk, and of Stinton Hall in Norfolk. In 1549 he was one of the many knights, esquires and gentlemen who assisted the Marquess of Northampton in putting down Kett's Rebellion at Norwich, where, with Sir Thomas Paston, Sir John Clere, Sir William Waldegrave and Sir Thomas Cornwallis, he was appointed to the defence of part of the city. By that date, or certainly by 1551, he had received knighthood.

In 1553, the year of his father's death and the accession of Queen Mary, Sir Henry Bedingfield succeeded his father as heir to the Oxburgh estate and the Hall which had been built by his grandfather, the elder Sir Edmund Bedingfield, (died 1496/97). It was to the March parliament of 1553, the second parliament of King Edward VI, that Sir Henry was first elected, on that occasion as Knight of the Shire for Suffolk: from this it is supposed that he was then acquiescent in the regency of the Duke of Northumberland.

Career
Bedingfeld held various offices, including Privy Councillor to King Edward VI and Queen Mary I, Constable and (in 1555) Lieutenant of the Tower of London, and (in 1557) Captain of the Guard and Vice-Chamberlain of the Household to Mary I.

After the death of King Edward VI in 1553, Sir Henry Bedingfeld and (Sir) Henry Jerningham (together with Sir William Drury, John Sulyard, Sir John Shelton, Clement Higham and others) were two supporters very instrumental in placing Mary Tudor on the throne, coming to her aid at Kenninghall or Framlingham with 140 well-armed men. Bedingfeld proclaimed the queen at Norwich. He was afterwards rewarded for his loyalty with an annual pension of 100 pounds out of the forfeited estates of Sir Thomas Wyatt. Queen Mary appointed him a Privy Councillor and Knight Marshal of her army. It was in the light of this allegiance that he was elected to the first parliament of Mary's reign in October 1553 as one of the Knights of the Shire for Norfolk, and again in the succeeding parliament of 1554.

In March 1554 Mary (following Wyatt's rebellion) placed her half-sister Princess Elizabeth in the Tower of London. She was certainly aware that her mother Katherine of Aragon in later life had been kept at Kimbolton in the custody of Sir Henry's father. She now entrusted Sir Henry with the princess Elizabeth's custody, appointing him Constable of the Tower of London on 8 May, and instructing him to guard Elizabeth at Woodstock Palace, where he remained with her until March 1555.

John Foxe, in the Acts and Monuments, took every opportunity to blacken Bedingfield's character, and depicted him as severe and cruel towards his charge. Although, after her accession to the throne in 1558, Elizabeth used to address Sir Henry at court as "Her Gaoler", most agree that the term was probably applied loosely and in good spirit. "That seems to have rather been a term of royal familiarity, than contempt; for had it been the latter, he would scarce have been so much at court as it appears he usually was," wrote Blomefield. The correspondence, published by C.R. Manning, suggests that Bedingfield conducted himself in gentlemanly fashion towards the princess: J.M. Stone, noting that Elizabeth granted the manor of Caldecott to him, observed that John Strype, Bishop Burnet and Sir Reginald Hennell had followed Foxe's account uncritically.

A mandate of Mary's to Bedingfield survives in which she instructs him to deliver his orders to the bearer, John Sulyard, and to receive from him her orders as if from herself, and to carry them out unfailingly. Sir Henry was appointed to the Lieutenancy of the Tower on 28 October 1555, after the resignation of Thomas Brydges. Among his prisoners were Sir Peter Carew, Sir Nicholas Arnold, Sir William Courtenay and Sir John Bray. Many unpleasant episodes passed in the Tower of London during Bedingfield's governance of it, not least the tortures and executions arising from the Henry Dudley conspiracy in 1556, and the enforced recantation of Sir John Cheke a few days after the death of Edward Lewknor. Yet several prisoners under his charge were permitted to have access to their wives or family members, and in such matters Sir Henry appears to have been the obedient interpreter of Mary's direct commands, rather than the initiator of autocratic or vindictive practises.

Bedingfeld's friend and fellow Privy Councillor was Sir Henry Jerningham: on 25 December 1557, as Sir Edward Hastings became Lord Chamberlain of the Household and Sir Thomas Cornwallis Comptroller, so Henry Jerningham became Master of the Horse and Henry Bedingfield succeeded Jerningham as Vice-Chamberlain and became Captain of the Guard. Both maintained friendship with Sir John Bourne, also a Privy Councillor and Secretary of State during the reign of Mary I. He was then re-elected for the third and last time as a Knight of the Shire for Norfolk in the parliament of 1558.

With the death of Queen Mary and the accession of Elizabeth in 1558, Sir Henry withdrew from public office and retired to Norfolk, though maintaining connections in court. According to Foxe, Elizabeth is said to have discouraged his presence, saying "If we have any prisoner whom we would have sharply and straitly kept, we will send for you!". Sir Henry remained a firm adherent to the Catholic faith, and in his last years was challenged for his recusancy. In December 1569 the justices of Suffolk delivered to the Privy Council various bonds of those who had refused to subscribe to a declaration of obedience to the Act of Uniformity 1558: these included a bond of Sir Henry's, dated 1 December 1569, for good behaviour towards the Queen and for his appearance before the Privy Council. His lands were valued at £500 and his goods at £1000 at Oxburgh in the Norfolk diocesan returns of recusants of 1577. In her royal progress of 1578 Elizabeth received Sir Henry's hospitality at Oxburgh, or intended to do so.

Elizabeth and Sir Henry at Woodstock, 1554–5
The correspondence and papers relating to Princess Elizabeth's confinement by Sir Henry Bedingfield are usefully presented by Manning, and narrated by J.M. Stone (1905), F.A. Mumby (1909) and Katherine Bedingfield (1912). These authors neither diminish Elizabeth's fears and terrors at the events nor needlessly vilify her custodian.

At the Tower of London
The following letter refers to Elizabeth's arrival at the Tower:"To the right worshipfull Sir Henry Bedingfeld Knt., give these, Written in haste. My dutye remembered these shal be to advyse you that on friday my lady Elisabeth was sent to the tower at 10 of the cloke, the Parliament shal be holden at Westminster the daye afore assured and the Quene is in good helthe, thanks be to God, who preserve you in much worshipe thys good fryday, rydyng by the way, by yours to commande, Thomas Walters."

Sir Henry is described by his historians as a stern Norfolk knight, "in whose courage and probity" the Queen knew that she could confide... However, when she first saw Sir Henry enter the inner court of the Tower with the hundred men-at-arms in their blue coats under his command, she asked in terror "if the Lady Jane's scaffold was removed." The Lieutenant of the Tower endeavoured to calm her by saying there was no cause for alarm, but his orders were to consign her into the charge of Sir Henry Bedingfeld, to be conveyed to Woodstock. "Elizabeth, not knowing what manner of man Bedingfeld was, inquired whether he made conscience of murder, if such an order were entrusted to him."

The journey to Woodstock
On 19 May she was removed from the Tower, first by barge at the Tower Wharf, and so to Richmond, where she had an interview with the Queen. The next day she crossed the river at Richmond to proceed on her journey to Woodstock. The letters and State documents relating to this journey throw further light upon it. Sir Henry's note on the affair was as follows: "A memoriall off all letters, warrants, etc., whyche I have to shewe concerning the s'vice aboute my lady Elizabeth's grace, whereunto I was commanded by the Quene's highnes, which s'vice began the 8th off May 1554 — fyrst yere off hyr moste noble reign."

Anthony, Humphrey, and Edmund Bedingfeld, brothers of Sir Henry, appear to have formed part of the guard brought by him to the Tower. In Sir Henry's report to the Queen of the journey from the Tower of London to Woodstock, he noted that the people between London and Windsor were not "hoole on matters of Religion" ...that "theye be fullye fyxed to stonde to the late abolyshyng off the byshopp off Romez aucthorite, as heretofore agaynste the order of all charite hath been establyshed by statute lawe within thys Realme." The letter goes on to say that "My Ladye Elisabeth's grace" had not "been verye well at ease," and yet she wanted to go out walking, "In the whyche and other lyke hyr requests I am mervolouslye p'plexed to graunte hyr desyer or to saye naye."

Next there was written "a remembrance off the journeye made by my Ladye Elizabeth's grace from Wyndsore to Syr Wyllm Dormer's house at West Wyckhm the xxth off maye 1 Marie Regine. Ffyrst when hyr grace cam to the castell gate to take hyr lytter, there stoode off Master Norrey's s'v'nts xvj, in tawneye coots, to receyve hyr oute, at whyche place there weere sum people to behold hyr... Itm, hyr grace passed the towne off Wyndsore wth moche gasyng off people unto Eton Colledge, where was used the like, as well by the scollers as others; the lyke in villages and ffeldes unto Wycombe, where most gasyng was used, and the wyves had p'pared cake and wafers w'ch at hir passing bye them, thei delyvered into the lytter. She receyved yt wth thanks untyll by the quantitee she was accombred and, wth the herbes delyvered in with the wafers, trobled as she sayde, and desyred the people to cease."

Arrival at Woodstock
At West Wycombe, Sir William Dormer and 17 servants in "blewe coats" awaited her, half-a-mile from his house, with Lady Dormer and her daughter-in-law. At Woburn Sir Henry began talking with a "husbande man," and found him "a verye protestunte," and thought there were many about there of "the same opinion." From the Dormers' house the princess and her suite went on to Lord William's, and thence to Woodstock. When the party arrived there, Queen Mary sent instructions to "her trustie and right well beloved counsellor Sir Henry Bedingfeld knyght." She had reason to believe that Elizabeth was implicated in some conspiracy against her, and she wrote that in the face of so much evidence it was difficult to believe that her sister was guiltless of the charges brought. Sir Henry was admonished to continue his "accustomed diligence in the charge by us comitted to yow."

Then followed a report that "my ladye Elizabeth's grace ys daylye vexed with the swellyng in the face and other parts off hir bodye," and Sir Henry deputed Edmund his brother to declare the same to "my lorde Chamberlayne" and to ask for a doctor. "Doctour Owen" wrote directions to Sir Henry on the subject: apparently he thought it was not the "tyme off the yere to minster purgacions owing to the distemperaunce of the weather."

After this, Sir Henry wrote a long letter to the Privy Council relating various conversations between himself and the princess, to which is added the following, "My lords it hath come to my knowledge by dyv'se creditable and wrshipfull p'sons, that the remayneng off Cranmer, Rydleye, and Latimer, at Oxforde, in such sort as theye dooe, hath done nooe smal hurte In theys parts, even amonge thoose that were knowne to be goode afore."

Pleasures and responsibilities
In her next letter to him, the Queen showed consideration for his comforts."Trustye and right well beloved, we gret you well, and wheare we understande yt by occasion of certyn our instructions Latelye gyvene unto you, ye doe continuallye make your personall abode within that our howse of Woodstock without removing from thence, at anye time, which thing might p'adventure in continuance be both som daunger to your helth, and be occasion also yt ye shall not be so well able to understande the state of the countreye theare abowts, as other wyse ye might. We let you wit yt, in consideracon thereof we are pleased ye maye at anye tyme when yourself shall thinke convenyant, make your repayre from owt of our sayed howse, leaving one of your brethren to loke to yor charge, and se to the good goverunce of that howse in yor absence. So as nevertheless ye returne back ageyne yor self at night, for the batter loking to yor sayed charge. And for yor better ease and recreacon we are in lyke manner pleased yt ye and yor brethren maye at yor libertyes halk for yor pastyme at the partrige, or hunt the hare, wthin that our maner of Woodstock or anye of our grounds adioynyng to the same, ffrom tyme to tyme, when ye shall thynke moste convenient; and that also ye maye yf ye shall so thinke good, cause yor wwf to be sent for, and to remayne theare wth you as long as yor self shall thinke meete. Geven under or signet, at or castle of Fernham ye — Julye, ye seconde yere of or Reigne."

Soon afterwards, Sir Henry wrote that if "this great Ladye shall remayne in this howse, there must be rep'acons done bothe to the covering of the house in lead and slate, and especially in glass and casemonds, or elles neyther she nor anye yt attendethe uppon hir shal be able to abyde for coulde." He wrote to the Bishop of Ely, asking to be released from his responsibility, as he had been for 15 weeks "in care off mynde and some travell of bodye": he begged him to remind the Lord Chancellor (Bishop Gardiner) how he had accepted the custody of the princess at Gardiner's earnest request, in a conversation held "uppon the caulseye (causeway) betwexte the house off saynete Jamys and Charyng Crosse." He added that he had asked for his Lordship's house at the "black friers" in London, but heard it was disposed of: therefore he now asked for the one at Holborn, as he has no house "off refuge in London, butte the comon Inne, and woulde be gladde to gyve large monye to be avoyded off that inconvenience."

Thomas Parry
Princess Elizabeth had an ally in her time at Woodstock:"Thomas Parry, the princess's cofferer, had to provide for her household but on 26 May, three days after her arrival at Woodstock, the Council told Bedingfield that there was no reason for Parry to stay there. Elizabeth's guardian communicated this decision to Parry, who baffled him by staying in the town. Parry now proceeded to make Bedingfield's life a misery. He first objected to the provisioning of his retinue out of Elizabeth's resources, until Bedingfield was commanded to supply them by a special warrant. This was simply a harassing tactic, for books were being conveyed to Elizabeth, some of which Bedingfield suspected of being seditious, and when Parry sent him two harmless ones he was forced to return them for want of explicit instructions. Bedingfield complained that he was helpless, as 'daily and hourly the said Parry may have and give intelligence,' and once again the cofferer's position was referred to the Council. Early in July Parry was at the Bull Inn, 'a marvellous colourable place to practise in,' receiving every day as many as 40 men in his own livery, besides Elizabeth's own servants. At length the Council forbade such large meetings and, from Bedingfield's subsequent silence on the point, it seems that the order was obeyed."

Religious welfare
Later, Sir Henry reported to the Council that the Lady Elizabeth, after "hir confession in Catholyke fourme dydde receyve the most comfortable Sacramente," and before receiving she declared to Sir Henry "that she had never plotted against the Queene." The Council replied that the Queen took great pleasure in the news that the Lady Elizabeth "doth so well conforme hirself in the receyvyng off the most blessed Sacramente off the altar." Sir Henry wrote to the Queen mentioning Elizabeth's use of the reformed prayer book, etc., and refers to Mary's recent marriage: he expressed the hope of an heir to the throne, which would be a joy to all true Englishmen, "that wee maye as holye Simeon dydde for the byrth of Chryste, prayse Godde for the same."

Evidently there was some difficulty in getting Elizabeth to give up the reformed prayer book, and in reply to Sir Henry's remonstrance she reminded him that it had been used in "the king my father his dayes." Bedingfeld doubted her orthodoxy, and also that of the ladies who attended her, and he recommended that some "lerned men" should "preche and talke with them in the matter of there religion." He again asked to be released from his unwelcome task at Woodstock, but no answer came. Through his intervention, the princess asked for, and obtained, a doctor and surgeon, and was bled in the arm and foot. She also asked to be moved nearer to London, as there was great difficulty in conveying provisions to Woodstock during the winter.

At length came a letter from the Queen ordering Sir Henry to bring Elizabeth with all speed to Hampton Court, and the good "gaoler" was free to return home.

Portraits
His portrait was at Oxburgh Hall, where it was described in the following manner: "Body full, face turned very slightly towards the sinister, grey eyes full, long nose, light brown hair, round beard and moustache turning grey, soft black cap right down on the head."  Dress: "Black doublet, high shoulders to it, and high black collar, very wide behind, small white frill all round the face; the right hand is forward clenched, probably holding gloves, frill round the wrist, a ring with an eagle displayed thereon, being on the third finger of the hand." S. Inscribed: "Anno D. 1573 ætatis suæ 68." "Sir Henry Bedingfeld Governor of the Tower." An engraving is in the National Portrait Gallery. A miniature, oil on ivory, dated c.1700–1799, is today at Oxburgh Hall, which now belongs to the National Trust. The miniature was previously in the ownership of the Conyngham family, Marquesses Conyngham, at Slane Castle, County Meath, Ireland.

Death and monument
Dame Katherine Bedingfeld was buried at Oxborough on 7 December 1581, and Sir Henry on 24 August 1583. Sir Henry's will, which gives a lively impression of the community at Oxburgh Hall, was dated 15 August 1583 and proved on 13 November following.

The Bedingfield chapel, Oxborough
Their monument is to be found in the Bedingfield chapel at the parish church of St John, Oxborough. Shortly after the Second World War the tower of this church collapsed, destroying most of the nave. The chancel of the church, together with the Bedingfield chapel which was built onto the south side of it, was spared destruction and still remains. The chapel is most famous for two tombs made of floriated terracotta components - the finest of their kind, among a series of early 16th century monuments mainly in East Anglia associated with families who intermarried with the Bedingfields. (They include, among others, the Marneys of Layer Marney Tower, Sir Philip Bothe of Shrubland Old Hall, and Sir Edward Echyngham of Barsham). One of these at Oxborough, a table tomb with a high arching canopy over it, extends across the chapel enclosing its eastern end as the inner sanctum of the Bedingfield memorials. The other, also with a canopy, stands across the archway opening on the north side into the chancel of the church, blocking the entry but affording a view into the chancel space. These are the tombs of Sir Henry's grandparents, Sir Edmund Bedingfield senr., Knight of the Bath, who died in 1496-97, and his second wife Dame Margaret Bedingfield (née Scott, the daughter of Sir John Scott of Scott's Hall), the latter of whom, dying a widow in 1514, by her will established the chapel.

Monument
The monument to Sir Henry himself and to his wife Katherine is undated, and stands against the south wall of the Bedingfield chapel. It is a large construction of vari-coloured marbles, in the form of a shallow altar table projecting from the wall. Its frontage is arranged as three pilasters of dark marble, separating two square panels of suffused reddish-veined marble which enclose inner panels of black marble. All these features are outlined with gilt mouldings. At the outer ends of the table arise a pair of tall detached grey columns with gilded bases and capitals of the Corinthian order. These support an elaborately moulded and dentillated horizontal entablature above, and frame a large wall-piece of suffused reddish-veined marble ornamented with gilded fetter-locks (a motif associated with this family) and a bandwork design, interwoven with a glittering thread-like decoration. All of this encloses a central dark panel with gilt lettering, which bears a Latin inscription:

"Casta Bedingfeldo Comes, hic Katharina Marito estLustris Viva decem, quae fuit ante Comes.Prole Virum Conjux, Vir adauxit honoribus illam,Factus post multos Nominis hujus Eques.Inde Satellitium sumpsit, Turrimque regendam,Pars a Consilijs Una, Maria tuis.Privatus Senium, Christoque, Sibique dicavit,Vir pius, et verae Religionis amans.Hospitio largus, miserisque suisque benignus,Ad Mortem et Morbi tædia, fortis erat."

(Here BEDINGFIELD's chaste consort, KATHARINA lies,Who ten times five years was his living bride.Of worthy stem, he brought her honours moreWhen raised a Knight, like sundry of his Name: Then of the Guards, of the Tower, he took command,One party of thy Counsels, MARIA queen.Retir'd, old age to Christ, to himself, he gave,A pious man, and true Religion's friend.A generous Host, benign to needy Kin,He bore the toils of Sickness, firm till Death.)

Heraldry
Over the entablature are three free-standing heraldic escutcheons, painted in polychrome. The centrepiece is a large circular frame with the arms of Bedingfield, ermine a spread eagle gules beaked and peded or, quartering the arms of Todenham, Peche, Rochester, Pateshull, Weyland, Herling, Jenny, Bourn of Long-Stratton, Waldegrave, Wyfold and Claworth. The Bedingfield crest is shown, a demi-eagle or. The sinister escutcheon, which is shield-shaped, has the arms of Bedingfield and Todenham quarterly, impaling those of Townsend and Brews quarterly (representing the marriage of Sir Henry and Dame Katharine). The dexter escutcheon has the shield of Townsend, with quarterings for Haywell, Brews, Ufford, Carbonell and Shardelowe.

Children
The children of Sir Henry Bedingfeld and Katherine Townsend were:

 Edmund Bedingfield (died 1585) of Eriswell in Suffolk, who married (1) Anne, daughter of Sir Robert Southwell of Hoxne, Suffolk; and (2) Anne, daughter of John Moulton of Thurgarton, Norfolk, Esq. The children of Edmund Bedingfield and Anne Southwell were:
 Thomas Bedingfield (died 9 April 1590), son and heir, married Frances, coheiress of John Jerningham of Somerleyton in Suffolk, Esq.
 Sir Henry Bedingfield (1587–1657)
 William, under age in 1593
 Edmund Bedingfeld of Briston in Norfolk, married Elizabeth, daughter of John Castell of Raveningham in Norfolk
 Edmund Bedingfeld
 Frances Bedingfeld
 Elizabeth Bedingfeld
 Anthony Bedingfeld
 Mary Bedingfeld (died 1629), married Sir William Cobb (died 27 August 1607) of Sandringham in Norfolk, Knight, the great-grandson of Francis Mountford. His descendants owned Sandringham until about 1686. Lady Cobb's name is to be found in 1595 in the 'Popish Recusant' Rolls
 Anne Bedingfeld, the wife of Robert Skerne of Bondby in Lincolnshire
 Nazareth Bedingfeld, the wife of Edward Yelverton of Norfolk. Both Nazareth and her husband were also recusants
 Thomas Bedingfeld, Gentleman pensioner to Queen Elizabeth, died 1613. Buried in St. James' Clerkenwell
 John Bedingfeld (died 1606+) of Redlingfield in Suffolk
 Nicholas Bedingfeld, of Swatshall in Gislingham, died without issue in 1636
 Henry Bedingfeld of Sturston
 Alice Bedingfeld, married (1) Thomas Carvell, eldest son of Humphrey Kerville of Wiggenhall St Mary Magdalen, Norfolk; and (2) Henry Seckford, Gentleman of the Privy Chamber to Queen Elizabeth
 Amy Bedingfeld, the wife of Thomas Wilbraham, Attorney of the Court of Wards
 Eva Bedingfeld (died 1631), the wife of William Yaxley of Yaxley, Suffolk
 Katherine Bedingfeld
 Elizabeth Bedingfeld, married Edmund Richers of Swannington, Norfolk
 Anne Bedingfeld

References

Sources
William Joseph Sheils, ‘Bedingfield family (per. 1476-1760)’, Oxford Dictionary of National Biography, Oxford University Press, 2004 [accessed 5 June 2005: http://www.oxforddnb.com/view/article/76392]
Ann Weikel, ‘Bedingfeld , Sir Henry (1509x11-1583)’, Oxford Dictionary of National Biography, Oxford University Press, 2004
J. M., Stone Studies From Court and Cloister, Essays Historical  and Literary, pb. 1908 London and Edinburgh sands and  company St Louis, MO.

1505 births
1583 deaths
Lieutenants of the Tower of London
People from King's Lynn
Members of Lincoln's Inn
Members of the Parliament of England for Norfolk
English MPs 1553 (Mary I)
English MPs 1554
English MPs 1558